Croxford is a surname. Notable people with the surname include:

Guy Croxford (born 1981), Zimbabwean cricketer
Henry Croxford (1845–1892), English professional cricketer
Tara Croxford (born 1968), Canadian field hockey player 
William Croxford (1863–1950), New Zealand cricketer